Christoph Werner Konrad (born 28 August 1957) is a German politician. He was a Member of the European Parliament for North Rhine-Westphalia from 1994 to 2009. He is a member of the conservative Christian Democratic Union, part of the European People's Party.

Born in Bochum, Northrhine-Westphalia, Konrad attended the University of Bonn on a political science and legal studies major, earning his Ph.D. under supervision of Karl Dietrich Bracher in 1990.

References

1957 births
Living people
MEPs for Germany 2004–2009
Christian Democratic Union of Germany MEPs
MEPs for Germany 1994–1999
MEPs for Germany 1999–2004